Gaymont or Camont is an unincorporated community and coal town  in Fayette County, West Virginia, United States.

References 

Unincorporated communities in West Virginia
Unincorporated communities in Fayette County, West Virginia
Coal towns in West Virginia